Protein Hook homolog 2 (HK2) is a protein that in humans is encoded by the HOOK2 gene.

Function 

Hook proteins are cytosolic coiled-coil proteins that contain conserved N-terminal domains, which attach to microtubules, and more divergent C-terminal domains, which mediate binding to organelles. The Drosophila Hook protein is a component of the endocytic compartment.

References

Further reading